Pseudorhiza aurosa is a species of true jellyfish within the family Lychnorhizidae found around Australia. The bell of the species reaches 40 centimeters wide, 13 centimeters high, and is flatly rounded.

References 

Animals described in 1882
Lychnorhizidae
Marine fauna of Australia